Oak Point is a place in the province of Manitoba, Canada that is designated as both an unincorporated community and a settlement.

References  

Settlements in Manitoba
Unincorporated communities in Interlake Region, Manitoba